Much has been written about Bach's ensembles (both in size and constituents—both vocal and instrumental) that he used.

In Bach's time  referred to more advanced vocal church music, usually accompanied by instrumental forces, such as his motets, church cantatas and passions. The vocal and instrumental forces used by Bach for the performance of such music are to a certain extent documented for all the periods of his life. Information about his secular orchestral and choral music is more limited: it mostly involves his period in Köthen, and his involvement with Leipzig's student orchestra, the Collegium Musicum performing at Café Zimmermann.

Before Leipzig

Arnstadt and Mühlhausen

Weimar and Köthen

Leipzig

Figural music
In 1730, Bach wrote a memo (Entwurff) to the Leipzig town council regarding musical staffing of the Leipzig churches for which he was responsible.

Vocal forces
In regards to vocal forces, Bach wrote:

which translates to:

He also lists in a note dating from about the same year (1730) the minimum requirements for the churches mentioned in the Entwurff:

Instrumental forces
Likewise, Bach wrote of the instrumental forces required:

which translates to:

Secular music

By performer and instrument types

Vocalists

Vocal soloists

Choir

Instruments

String section

Winds

Continuo and organ

After 1750

Second half of the 18th century

19th century

20th century

21st century
In the 21st century, several conductors have recorded all or most of Bach's cantatas using choirs with three or four singers per part. For instance, Philippe Herreweghe has performed and recorded "Bach ... as he practiced in Leipzig, with three suitable singers per voice group". Herreweghe sees voices suitable for Bach as "small" voices, voice types with certain characteristics: he names Peter Kooij and Dorothee Mields as examples of that voice type. 

By contrast, a number of 21st-century Bach conductors have instead accepted Joshua Rifkin's arguments that most of Johann Sebastian Bach's choral music was performed with only one singer per voice part.

References

Sources
 Malcolm Boyd. Bach. Oxford University Press, 2006. 

Johann Sebastian Bach
Historically informed performance